Borda is a lunar impact crater that lies between Santbech to the north-northwest and Reichenbach slightly further away to the south-southeast. It was named after French astronomer Jean-Charles de Borda. It has a low rim that is broken along the southeast by a smaller crater. The rim is intruded into by another small crater along the southwest side, and there is an irregular cleft along the northwest face. There is a central peak at the midpoint of the floor.

References

 
 
 
 
 
 
 
 
 
 
 

Impact craters on the Moon